Reginald Tustin Baker   (4 July 1900 – 18 December 1966) was an English organist and composer.

Biography

Baker was born in 1900 in Gloucester, the son of Albert William Baker (b. 1860) and Emily Jane Tustin (1861–1918).  He studied organ under Herbert Brewer at Gloucester Cathedral and became his assistant from 1920–26, after fighting in the British Army during the First World War.

He died in December 1966 in Sheffield Cathedral following Evening Prayer.

Appointments

Assistant organist of Gloucester Cathedral 1920–26
Organist of St. Luke's Church, San Francisco 1926–28
Organist of Hexham Abbey 1928–29
Organist of Halifax Minster after 1929–37
Organist of Sheffield Cathedral 1939–66

Compositions

His compositions include:
Evening Service in D
Communion Service in A flat
Anthems: At the Lord's High Feast, The Lord in my Shepherd, Bow thine ear.
Choral songs: Sleep Holy Babe, Christ was born on Christmas Day, Sing O Sing, I wandered lonely as a cloud.

References

1900 births
1966 deaths
English organists
British male organists
Fellows of the Royal College of Organists
20th-century classical musicians
20th-century English composers
20th-century organists
20th-century British male musicians
20th-century British musicians